Thiocarbonic acid is an inorganic acid which is an analog of carbonic acid  (or ), in which all oxygen atoms are replaced with sulfur atoms. It is an unstable hydrophobic red oily liquid with the chemical formula  (or ).

It is often referred to as trithiocarbonic acid so as to differentiate it from other carbonic acids containing sulfur, such as monothiocarbonic O,O-acid , monothiocarbonic O,S-acid , dithiocarbonic O,S-acid  and dithiocarbonic S,S-acid  (see thiocarbonates).

Discovery and synthesis
It was first reported in brief by Zeise in 1824 and later in more detail by Berzelius in 1826, in both cases it was produced by the action of carbon disulfide on a hydrosulfide salt (e.g. potassium hydrosulfide).
CS2 + 2 KSH → K2CS3 + H2S

Treatment with acids liberates the thiocarbonic acid as a red oil
K2CS3 + 2 HX → H2CS3 + 2 KX

Both the acid and many of its salts are unstable and decompose via the release of carbon disulfide, particularly upon heating:
H2CS3 → CS2 + H2S

An improved synthesis involves addition of barium trithiocarbonate to hydrochloric acid at 0 °C.  This method provided samples with which many measurement have been made.

Despite its lability, crystals of thiocarbonic acid have been examined by X-ray crystallography, which confirms the anticipated molecular structure of a trigonal–planar central carbon atom.  The C-S bond lengths range from 1.69 to 1.77 Å.

Reactions
Thiocarbonic acid is acidic, with the first pKa being -2.3.  The second pKa is near 7.  It dissolves S8, but does not react with it.

It reacts with bifunctional reagents to give rings.  1,2-Dichloroethane gives ethylenetrithiocarbonate.  Oxalyl chloride gives oxalotrithiocarbonate.

Applications
Thiocarbonic acid currently has no significant applications. Its esters, which are sometimes called thioxanthates, find use in RAFT polymerization.

References 

Hydrogen compounds
Sulfur(−II) compounds
Inorganic carbon compounds